Lorenzoni is an Italian surname. Notable people with this surname include:

 Giulia Lorenzoni (born 1940), Italian fencer
 Giuseppe Lorenzoni (1843–1914), Italian astronomer
 Michele Lorenzoni (17th century), Italian gunsmith based in Florence
 Nicolai Lorenzoni (born 1992), German-Swiss footballer
 Onyx Lorenzoni (born 1954), Brazilian politician, businessman, and veterinarian
 Pietro Antonio Lorenzoni (1721–1782), Austrian painter

See also
 40447 Lorenzoni, a minore planet discovered on 11 September 1999, in Bologna, Italy
 Giardino Botanico Alpino "Giangio Lorenzoni", an alpine botanical garden located in Pian di Cansiglio, Province of Belluno, Italy

Italian-language surnames
Patronymic surnames
Surnames from given names